Pardah is a Pakistani Urdu film directed, produced and written by Nazir Ajmeri. It stars Shamim Ara and Habib in young to old roles. The film is about a man who kept one his secret under wraps for years. Music was composed by Safdar Hussain. At Box office, the film performed averagely.

The film was among the one of the final films of the director Ajmeri, who directed successful films like Qismat (1957) and Paighaam (1963).

Plot 

Tired of his domestic tensions due to fights with his wife, Moazzam comes across a naive villager maiden, Zahida. He feels at ease in her company, and during his often visits to her spends good time with her. After her mother's death, the only individual of her family, he marries with her. Moazzam who is already married keeps his second marriage a secret and spends time with Zahida in another house. She gets pregnant and gives birth to a baby girl.

Years passed away, and they still keep their marriage a secret. On adolescence, their daughter Mahjabeen come across two of her class-fellows who fall for her. Later, it is revealed that one of them is the son of Moazzam from his first wife, while the other one is his nephew.

Cast 

 Shamim Ara
 Habib
 Gulrukh
 Komal
 Roshan
 Shakeel
 Hameed Wain
 Saqi

Release 

The film was released on 18 March 1966 in the cinemas of Karachi and Lahore, and did average to flop business at the Box office.

Soundtrack 
The soundtrack album of the film was composed by Safdar Hussain, and lyrics by Fayyaz Hashmi.

Track list 

 Bra Sukh Chain Mere Chote Se Gaon Mein by Irene Perveen, Munir Hussain and chorus
 Haye Allah Ji, Kaise Kis Ko Bataun by Mala Begum
 Idhar Aao, Tumhare Kaan Mein Ek Baat Kehna Hai by Saleem Raza and Mala
 Saaz-e-Dil Chera Hai Hum Ne by Mala
 Shaheedo Ka Khoon, Tum Se Kya Keh Raha Hai by Mala

References 

Urdu-language Pakistani films
1960s Urdu-language films
Pakistani black-and-white films
Pakistani romantic drama films